Redi Vogli (born 29 April 1987) is an Albanian professional basketball player who plays for BC Tirana in the Albanian Basketball League as well as the Albania national team.

References

1987 births
Living people
Albanian men's basketball players
Basketball players from Tirana
Shooting guards